Kutubdia is an upazila of Cox's Bazar District in the Division of Chittagong, Bangladesh. The upazila consists of an island in the Bay of Bengal, off the coast near Chakaria, Cox's Bazar.

History
A police station at Kutubdia was established in 1917. The island was upgraded into an upazila in 1983. Abdul Malek Shah was born on this island.

It is famous for the only lighthouse in Bangladesh which was built by the British during the British rule. Kutubdia is rich in producing salt and dried fish, locally known as 'Shutki'.

Geography
Climate change and sea level rise threaten to submerge the island in the Bay of Bengal.

Demographics
According to the 2011 Bangladesh census, Kutubdia had a population of 125,000. Males constituted 51% of the population, and females 49%. The population aged 18 or over was 41, 755. Kutubdia had an average literacy rate of 24.1% (7+ years), the national average being 32.4% literate. The most populated area is Ali Akbar Dale.  Thousands of visitors visit this island daily due to journeys and other business related work.

Administration
Kutubdia Upazila is divided into six union parishads: Ali Akbardeil, Baraghop, Dakshin Dhurung, Kaiyarbil, Lemsikhali, and Uttar Dhurung. The union parishads are subdivided into 8 mauzas and 55 villages.

See also
 Upazilas of Bangladesh
 Districts of Bangladesh
 Divisions of Bangladesh
 List of islands of Bangladesh
 List of lighthouses in Bangladesh

References

		

Upazilas of Cox's Bazar District
Islands of Bangladesh
Lighthouses in Bangladesh
Populated places in Bangladesh
Islands of the Bay of Bengal